Mitchells Presbyterian Church is a historic Presbyterian church located on VA 652 in Mitchells, Culpeper County, Virginia.  It was built in 1879, and is a one-story, frame building in the Carpenter Gothic style.  It measures 50 feet by 30 feet and sits on a brick foundation.  The interior features a trompe-l'œil fresco added between 1892 and 1899 by well-known local artist Joseph Oddenino.  He also painted the interior murals at Elmwood.

It was listed on the National Register of Historic Places in 1980.

References

Churches on the National Register of Historic Places in Virginia
Presbyterian churches in Virginia
National Register of Historic Places in Culpeper County, Virginia
Carpenter Gothic church buildings in Virginia
Churches completed in 1879
Churches in Culpeper County, Virginia